is a Japanese anime series adapted from the manga of the same title written by Homura Kawamoto and illustrated by Tōru Naomura. The anime television series is animated by MAPPA. It aired from July to September 2017 on Tokyo MX, MBS and other channels. A second season titled Kakegurui ×× aired from January to March 2019. The cast reprised their roles, and the staff returned for the second season. Netflix began streaming the series in 2018 and a spin-off series, titled Kakegurui Twin aired in August 2022.

History

Development
Kakegurui is an anime series adapted from the manga of the same title written by Homura Kawamoto and illustrated by Tōru Naomura. The anime television series is animated by MAPPA.

The music videos for the opening and closing themes were released in 2017.

First season release
The first season of Kakegurui aired from July 1 to September 23, 2017, on Tokyo MX, MBS and other channels. Yuichiro Hayashi directed the series, Yasuko Kobayashi handled the scripts, and Manabu Akita handled the character designs. Technoboys Pulcraft Green-Fund composed the music for the series. The opening theme is "Deal with the Devil", performed by Tia. D-Selections performed the ending theme "LAYon-theLINE". The first season is licensed and streamed by Netflix, first in 2018, and ran for 12 episodes. Anime Limited acquired the series for release on home video in the United Kingdom and Ireland. Sentai Filmworks acquired the series for release on home video in the United States.

Concerning reception of the first season, Collider gave the anime series release on Netflix a negative review, although did note it was catered to fans of gambling and sexualized characters. About the anime first season, GoombaStomp wrote "Kakegurui is a sometimes silly, often intoxicating anime that had all the makings of something truly special...regardless of its shortcomings, Kakegurui is worth being watched if just for its gripping gambling bouts alone."

Second season release
In August 2018, it was announced that Kakegurui season 2 would debut in Japan in January 2019. A second season titled Kakegurui ×× aired from January 8 to March 26, 2019. The cast reprised their roles, and the staff returned for the second season. Kiyoshi Matsuda joined Yuichiro Hayashi as director for the second season. For season 2 of the anime, Yasuko Kobayashi and Manabu Akita served respectively as writer and character designer, with MAPPA handling animation for the second season as well. Mitsuki Saiga was added to the season 2 cast, voicing the new character Miloslava Honebami. The second season's opening theme song is  performed by JUNNA, while the ending theme is "AlegriA" performed by D-selections. The second season ran for 12 episodes.

According to Thrillist, Kakegurui XX aired on Netflix in 2019.

Cast

Episode list

Kakegurui

Kakegurui ××

Notes

References

External links
 Official website 
  
 
 

2017 anime television series debuts
2019 anime television series debuts
Anime and manga about gambling
MAPPA
Netflix original anime
Sentai Filmworks
Television shows written by Yasuko Kobayashi